Damian Warchoł (born 19 July 1995) is a Polish professional footballer who plays as a midfielder for Wisła Płock.

Career
After one season with Unia Skierniewice, Warchoł joined Pelikan Łowicz on 23 July 2019. In 2020, he was signed as the Legia Warsaw II player. On July 14, 2020, Damian Warchoł was reported to the games as a player of its PKO Ekstraklasa first team. He made his debut on the July 19, 2020 in the match against Pogoń Szczecin, as he scored to 1–2.

On 14 July 2021, Warchoł joined Wisła Płock on a deal until June 2022 with a option for one further year.

Honours
Legia Warsaw
 Ekstraklasa: 2019–20

References

External links
 
 
 

Living people
1995 births
Polish footballers
Association football midfielders
Footballers from Łódź
GKS Bełchatów players
Widzew Łódź players
Raków Częstochowa players
Olimpia Grudziądz players
MKS Kluczbork players
Pelikan Łowicz players
Legia Warsaw II players
Legia Warsaw players
Wisła Płock players
Ekstraklasa players
I liga players
II liga players
III liga players